The 2018 Orange Bowl was a college football bowl game played on Saturday, December 29, 2018, at Hard Rock Stadium in Miami. The 85th edition of the Orange Bowl was one of two College Football Playoff semifinal games, the game featured two of the four teams selected by the College Football Playoff Selection Committee—Alabama from the SEC, and Oklahoma from the Big 12 Conference. Alabama took off with a 28-0 lead in the early 2nd quarter and never looked backed to win 45-34. They advanced to face the winner of the Cotton Bowl (Clemson) in the 2019 College Football Playoff National Championship. It was one of the 2018–19 bowl games concluding the 2018 FBS football season. Sponsored by the Capital One Financial Corporation, the game was officially known as the College Football Playoff Semifinal at the Capital One Orange Bowl.

Teams
The game featured top-ranked Alabama of the Southeastern Conference (SEC) against fourth-ranked Oklahoma of the Big 12 Conference. The programs had previously met five times, with Oklahoma leading the series, 3–1–1. They first met in the 1963 Orange Bowl, won by Alabama, 17–0. Their most recent meeting was in the 2014 Sugar Bowl, a 45–31 Oklahoma victory.

Alabama Crimson Tide

Alabama defeated Georgia in the 2018 SEC Championship Game on December 1, then received their bid to the Orange Bowl with the release of final CFP rankings on December 2. The Crimson Tide entered the bowl with a 13–0 record (8–0 in conference). On December 25, it was announced that three Alabama players, including starting offensive lineman Deonte Brown, would not play in the game due to an unspecified violation of team rules.

Oklahoma Sooners

Oklahoma defeated Texas in the 2018 Big 12 Championship Game on December 1, then received their bid to the Orange Bowl with the release of final CFP rankings on December 2. The Sooners entered the bowl with a 12–1 record (8–1 in conference); their only loss was to Texas, by a score of 45–48 in the 113th Red River Showdown on October 6.

Game summary

Scoring summary

Statistics

References

External links

Box score at ESPN

Orange Bowl
2018–19 College Football Playoff
Orange Bowl
Orange Bowl
Orange Bowl
Alabama Crimson Tide football bowl games
Oklahoma Sooners football bowl games